Josef Bille (born 20 September 1944 in Neuenkirchen) is a German physicist.

Life 
Bille studied physics at Karlsruhe Institute of Technology in Germany. From 1974 to 1978 he worked for the company Hoechst AG. Since 1978 Bille worked at Heidelberg University. From 1986 to 1991 Bille worked at the University of California. He patented surgical lasers for LASIK in 1988. He founded five companies in Heidelberg and United States.

Awards 
 1999: German Future Prize
 2012: European Inventor Award

References

External links 
 Focus: Zwei Deutsche gewinnen europäischen Erfinderpreis

1944 births
Living people
People from Steinfurt (district)
People from the Province of Westphalia
20th-century German inventors
German company founders
20th-century German physicists
21st-century German physicists
Academic staff of Heidelberg University